JCB Prize for Literature is an Indian literary award established in 2018. It is awarded annually with  prize to a distinguished work of fiction by an Indian writer working in English or translated fiction by an Indian writer. The winners will be announced each November with shortlists in October and longlists in September. It has been called "India's most valuable literature prize". Rana Dasgupta is the founding Literary Director of the JCB Prize. In 2020, Mita Kapur was appointed as the new Literary Director.

The JCB Literature Foundation was established to maintain the award. It is funded by the English construction manufacturing group JCB. Publishers are allowed, per imprint, to enter two novels originally written in English and two novels translated into English from another language.

Honourees 
Winners indicated with a blue ribbon.

2018
The inaugural JCB Prize longlist was announced in September 2018. The 5-member shortlist was announced October 2018. The winner was announced October 25, 2018.

 Amitabha Bagchi, Half the Night is Gone
  Benyamin, Jasmine Days (Translated from Malayalam by Shahnaz Habib)
 Perumal Murugan, Poonachi (Translated from Tamil by N Kalyan Raman)
 Anuradha Roy, All the Lives We Never Lived
 Shubanghi Swarup, Latitudes of Longing

2019 

The longlist was announced September 2019. The five-member shortlist was announced November 2019. The winner was announced November 5, 2019.

 Roshan Ali, Ib's Endless Search for Satisfaction
 Manoranjan Byapari, There's Gunpowder in the Air (Translated from Bengali by Arunava Sinha)
 Perumal Murugan, A Lonely Harvest and Trial by Silence (Both translated from Tamil by Aniruddhan Vasudevan)
 Hansda Sowvendra Shekhar, My Father's Garden
  Madhuri Vijay, The Far Field

2020 
The longlist was announced in September, 2020. The shortlist was announced on 25 September 2020. The winner was announced on November 7, 2020.

 Deepa Anappara, Djinn Patrol on the Purple Line
 Samit Basu, Chosen Spirits 
 Dharini Bhaskar, These, Our Bodies, Possessed by Light 
  S. Hareesh, Moustache (Translated from Malayalam by Jayasree Kalathil) 
 Annie Zaidi, Prelude to a Riot

2021 
The longlist was announced in September, 2021. The shortlist was announced on October 4, 2021. The winner was announced on November 13, 2021.

 VJ James, Anti-Clock (Translated from the Malayalam by Ministhy S)
 Daribha Lyndem, Name Place Animal Thing
 Shabir Ahmad Mir, The Plague Upon Us
   M Mukundan, Delhi: A Soliloquy (Translated from the Malayalam by Fathima EV and Nandakumar K)
 Lindsay Pereira, Gods and Ends

2022 

The longlist was announced on 3 September 2022. The shortlist was announced on 21 October 2022. For the first time in five years, all five books on the shortlist were translated books. The winner was announced on 19 November 2022.

 Manoranjan Byapari, Imaan (Translated from the Bengali by Arunava Sinha)
 Chuden Kabimo, Song of the Soil (Translated from the Nepali by Ajit Baral)
  Khalid Jawed, The Paradise of Food (Translated from the Urdu by Baran Farooqi)
 Geetanjali Shree, Tomb of Sand (Translated from the Hindi by Daisy Rockwell)
 Sheela Tomy, Valli (Translated from the Malayalam by Jayasree Kalathil)

References

External links
JCB Prize website

Indian literary awards
Awards established in 2018
2018 establishments in India
Fiction awards
Translation awards
English-language literary awards